John Gregory Kelly (born February 15, 1956) is an American prelate of the Roman Catholic Church, serving as an auxiliary bishop for the Diocese of Dallas in Texas since 2016.

Biography

Early life 
John Kelly was born on February 15, 1956, in Le Mars, Iowa, Kelly attended Holy Trinity Seminary in Irving, Texas. He received his Bachelor of Philosophy degree in 1978  and his Master of Divinity degree in 1982 from the University of Dallas. 

On May 15, 1982, Kelly was ordained by Bishop Thomas Tschoepe to the priesthood for the Diocese of Dallas.

Auxiliary Bishop of Dallas
Pope Francis appointed Kelly as an auxiliary bishop for the Diocese of Dallas on December 16, 2015. On February 11, 2016, Kelly was ordained by Bishop Kevin Farrell.

See also

 Catholic Church hierarchy
 Catholic Church in the United States
 Historical list of the Catholic bishops of the United States
 List of Catholic bishops of the United States
 Lists of patriarchs, archbishops, and bishops

References

External links
 Roman Catholic Diocese of Dallas Official Site

Episcopal succession

1956 births
Living people
People from Le Mars, Iowa
University of Dallas alumni
Catholics from Iowa
21st-century Roman Catholic bishops in the United States
Bishops appointed by Pope Francis